Stictochila is a genus of moths of the family Oecophoridae.

Species
Stictochila delosticta  (Turner, 1946)
Stictochila metata  (Meyrick, 1914)
Stictochila myriospila  (Lower, 1903)
Stictochila sarcoptera  (Lower, 1897)

References

Markku Savela's ftp.funet.fi

 
Oecophorinae
Moth genera